N. metallicus may refer to:
 Niveoscincus metallicus, the metallic cool-skink or metallic skink, a lizard species endemic to Australia
 Notropis metallicus, a ray-finned fish species

See also
 Metallicus (disambiguation)